The sixth season of House premiered on September 21, 2009, with a two-hour premiere filmed at the Greystone Park Psychiatric Hospital in New Jersey. In the United Kingdom, the season began airing on Sky 1 and Sky 1 HD on October 4, 2009.  Season six featured 22 episodes, two fewer than usual. It is the first season of House to feature Hugh Laurie as the only original cast member in all episodes, and the last season to feature Jennifer Morrison as a main cast member. It was fairly well critically received, scoring 77 on Metacritic.

Cast and characters

Main cast
 Hugh Laurie as Dr. Gregory House
 Lisa Edelstein as Dr. Lisa Cuddy
 Omar Epps as Dr. Eric Foreman
 Robert Sean Leonard as Dr. James Wilson
 Jennifer Morrison as Dr. Allison Cameron
 Jesse Spencer as Dr. Robert Chase
 Peter Jacobson as Dr. Chris Taub
 Olivia Wilde as Dr. Remy "Thirteen" Beaureguard Hadley

Recurring cast
 Michael Weston as Lucas Douglas
 Jennifer Crystal Foley as Rachel Taub
 Andre Braugher as Dr. Darryl Nolan
 Cynthia Watros as Dr. Sam Carr
 Lin-Manuel Miranda as Juan "Alvie" Álvarez
 Patrick Price as Nurse Jeffrey Sparkman
 Tracy Vilar as Nurse Regina
 Christina Vidal as Nurse Sandy
 Vernee Watson-Johnson as Nurse Smits
 Maurice Godin as Dr. Lawrence Hourani
 Ron Perkins as Dr. Ron Simpson
 Nigel Gibbs as Sanford Wells

Guest cast
Ray Abruzzo, Sasha Alexander, Eva Amurri, Curtis Armstrong, Annabelle Attanasio, Alexandra Barreto, Neill Barry, Angela Bettis, Jolene Blalock, Dennis Boutsikaris, Roger Aaron Brown, Sarah Wayne Callies, Samuel Carman, Willie C. Carpenter, Larry Cedar, Nick Chinlund, Shelly Cole, Bianca Collins, Joseph Culp, Vicki Davis, Alex Désert, Megan Dodds, Denise Dowse, Shane Edelman, Ethan Embry, Mark Damon Espinoza, Kim Estes, Nick Eversman, Rob Evors, Celia Finkelstein, Cali Fredrichs, Andrea Gabriel, Holly Gagnier, Adam Garcia, Troy Garity, Beau Garrett, Marcus Giamatti, Carl Gilliard, Ben Giroux, Jeremy Howard, JD Jackson, James Earl Jones, Orlando Jones, Sarah Jones, Paul Keeley, Doug Kruse, John Lacy, Katherine LaNasa, Andrew Harrison Leeds, Ana Lenchantin, Riki Lindhome, Eric Lutes, Tanner Maguire, Joshua Malina, David Marciano, James McCauley, Da'Vone McDonald, Doug McKean, Zoe McLellan, Jamie McShane, Gonzalo Menendez, David Monahan, Jonathan Murphy, Garikayi Mutambirwa, Trever O'Brien, Marnette Patterson, Artemis Pebdani, Jack Plotnick, Franka Potente, Esteban Powell, Laura Prepon, Anthony Tyler Quinn, Wes Ramsey, Kim Rhodes, Derek Richardson, Adam Rothenberg, Freda Foh Shen, Jon Seda, Noah Segan, China Shavers, Patrick St. Esprit, David Strathairn, Lee Tergesen, Desean Terry, Dale E. Turner, Bernardo Verdugo, Rick D. Wasserman, Charlie Weber and Jessica Whitaker.

Episodes

Home media

DVD

Blu-ray

References 
General
 
 

Specific

Further reading

Notes

External links 
 
 House recaps at televisionwithoutpity.com
 House episodes information at film.com
 List of House episodes at TVGuide.com
 

 
2009 American television seasons